Foxy Lady was a television comedy series made between October 1982 and February 1984 by Granada Television. It was set in the 1960s and revolved around a young female reporter, Daisy Jackson (played by Diane Keen), who worked for a newspaper and encountered sexism from her colleagues.

External links

1982 British television series debuts
1984 British television series endings
ITV sitcoms
Television series set in the 1960s
1980s British sitcoms
English-language television shows
Television shows produced by Granada Television